Filippo Andrea V Doria Pamphili (29 September 1813 – 19 March 1876) was an Italian politician. He was born in Rome, the son of Luigi Giovanni Andrea Dorea Pamphili and Teresa Orsini di Gravina. He was a recipient of the Order of Saints Maurice and Lazarus and the Order of the Crown of Italy.

References

External links

 

1813 births
1876 deaths
19th-century Italian politicians
Mayors of Rome
Recipients of the Order of Saints Maurice and Lazarus